Miss Nobody is a 1996 Polish drama film directed by Andrzej Wajda. It was entered into the 47th Berlin International Film Festival where Anna Wielgucka won an Honourable Mention.

Cast
 Anna Wielgucka as Marysia Kawczak
 Anna Mucha as Kasia Bogdanska
 Anna Powierza as Ewa
 Stanisława Celińska as Ewa
 Jan Janga-Tomaszewski as Marysia's Father
 Malgorzata Potocka as Ewa's Mother
 Leszek Teleszyński as Ewa's Father
 Małgorzata Pieczyńska as Kasia's Mother
 Anna Romantowska as Form Tutor
 Adam Siemion as Tadzio, Marysia's Brother

References

External links

1996 films
1990s Polish-language films
1996 drama films
Films directed by Andrzej Wajda
Polish drama films